The 3-subset meet-in-the-middle (hereafter shortened MITM) attack is a variant of the generic meet-in-the-middle attack, which is used in cryptology for hash and block cipher cryptanalysis. The 3-subset variant opens up the possibility to apply MITM attacks on ciphers, where it is not trivial to divide the keybits into two independent key-spaces, as required by the MITM attack.

The 3-subset variant relaxes the restriction for the key-spaces to be independent, by moving the intersecting parts of the keyspaces into a subset, which contains the keybits common between the two key-spaces.

History 
The original MITM attack was first suggested in an article by Diffie and Hellman in 1977, where they discussed the cryptanalytic properties of DES.

Many variations has emerged, since Diffie and Hellman suggested MITM attacks. These variations either makes MITM attacks more effective, or allows them to be used in situations, where the basic variant cannot. The 3-subset variant was shown by Bogdanov and Rechberger in 2011, and has shown its use in cryptanalysis of ciphers, such as the lightweight block-cipher family KTANTAN.

Procedure 
As with general MITM attacks, the attack is split into two phases: A key-reducing phase and a key-verification phase. In the first phase, the domain of key-candidates is reduced, by applying the MITM attack. In the second phase, the found key-candidates are tested on another plain-/ciphertext pair to filter away the wrong key(s).

Key-reducing phase 
Instead of having to conform to the limitation that the keybits of the two subciphers should be independent, the 3-subset attack allows for splitting the cipher into two subciphers, where some of the bits are allowed to be used in both of the subciphers.

This is done by splitting the key into three subsets instead, namely:
  = the keybits the two subciphers have in common.
  = the keybits distinct to the first subcipher, 
  = the keybits distinct to the second subcipher, 

To now carry out the MITM attack, the 3 subsets are bruteforced individually, according to the procedure below:
 For each guess of :
 Calculate the intermediate value  from the plaintext, for all key-bit combinations in 
 Calculate the intermediate value , for all key-bit combinations in 
When there is a match. Store it is a key-candidate.

Key-testing phase 
Each key-candidate found in the key-reducing phase, is now tested with another plain-/ciphertext pair. This is done simply by seeing if the encryption of the plaintext, P, yields the known ciphertext, C. Usually only a few other pairs are needed here, which makes the 3-subset MITM attack, have a very little data complexity.

Example 
The following example is based on the attack done by Rechberger and Bogdanov on the KTANTAN cipher-family. The naming-conventions used in their paper is also used for this example. The same goes for KTANTAN48 and KTANTAN64, which complexities can be seen at the end of the example.

The attack is possible, due to weaknesses exploited in KTANTAN's bit-wise key-schedule. It is applicable to both KTANTAN32, KTANTAN48 and KTANTAN64, since all the variations uses the same key-schedule. It is not applicable to the related KANTAN family of block-ciphers, due to the variations in the key-schedule between KTANTAN and KANTAN.

Overview of KTANTAN 
KTANTAN is a lightweight block-cipher, meant for constrained platforms such as RFID tags, where a cryptographic primitive such as AES, would be either impossible (given the hardware) or too expensive to implement. It was invented by Canniere, Dunkelman and Knezevic in 2009. It takes a block size of either 32, 48 or 64 bits, and encrypts it using an 80-bit key over 254 rounds. Each round utilizes two bits of the key (selected by the key schedule) as round key.

Attack

Preparation 
In preparation to the attack, weaknesses in the key schedule of KTANTAN that allows the 3-subset MITM attack was identified. 
Since only two key-bits are used each round, the diffusion of the key per round is small - the safety lies in the number of rounds. Due to this structure of the key-schedule, it was possible to find a large number of consecutive rounds, which never utilized certain key-bits.

More precisely, the authors of the attack found that:
 Round 1 to 111 never uses the key-bits: 
 Round 131 to 254 never uses the key-bits: 

This characteristics of the key-schedule is used for staging the 3-subset MITM attack, as we now are able to split the cipher into two blocks with independent key-bits. The parameters for the attack are thus: 
  = the keybits used by both blocks (which means the rest 68 bits not mentioned above)
  = the keybits used only by the first block (defined by round 1-111)
  = the keybits used only by the second block (defined by round 131-254)

Key-reducing phase 
One may notice a problem with step 1.3 in the key-reducing phase. This is mitigated by another MITM technique called partial-matching. They thus only compared part of the state, by comparing those 8 bits (It was 8 bits at round 127 for KTANTAN32. It was 10 bits at round 123 and 47 bits at round 131 for KTANTAN48 and KTANTAN64, respectively). Doing this yields more false positives, but nothing that increases the complexity of the attack noticeably.

Key-testing phase 
KTANTAN32 requires on average 2 pairs now to find the key-candidate, due to the false positives from only matching on part of the state of the intermediate values. KTANTAN48 and KTANTAN64 on average still only requires one plain-/ciphertext pair to test and find the correct key-candidates.

Results 
For:
The data complexity is 3 plain-/ciphertext pairs. 
The results are taken from the article by Rechberger and Bogdanov.

This is not the best attack on KTANTAN anymore. The best attack as of 2011 is contributed to Wei, Rechberger, Guo, Wu, Wang and Ling which improved upon the MITM attack on the KTANTAN family.

Notes 

Computer network security
Cryptographic attacks